Stoyky was a  of the Soviet and later Russian navy.

Development and design 

The project began in the late 1960s when it was becoming obvious in the Soviet Navy that naval guns still had an important role particularly in support of amphibious landings, but existing gun cruisers and destroyers were showing their age. A new design was started, employing a new  automatic gun turret.

Construction and career 
Stoyky was laid down on 28 September 1982 and launched on 27 July 1985 by Zhdanov Shipyard in Leningrad.  She was commissioned on 24 February 1987.

From October 1 to October 19, 1988, the USSR Ministry of Defense inspected the ship and assessed its condition as unsatisfactory.

In 1989, the destroyer underwent repairs. The repeat of the firing test carried out in November 1989 was rated as excellent.

On January 15, 1990, she entered combat service in the South China Sea, crossed the Indian Ocean and was on combat duty in the Gulf of Oman. In July 1990, she returned to Vladivostok for repairs.

On April 1, 1991, Stoyky was transferred to the 193rd Brigade of anti-submarine ships of the Soviet-Gavan naval base.

From March 20, 1992, the ship was assigned for repairs at SRZ-178, but the repair was not carried out.

On October 22, 1993, the ship was transferred to Dalzavod.

On April 28, 1994, the destroyer was transferred to the 36th division of missile ships 10 OPESK.

In September 1996, the repairs were stopped, and on September 14, the Stoyky was towed to Strelok Bay for mothballing.

On May 30, 1998, by order of the Ministry of Defense No. 034, the ship was excluded from the Russian Navy.

On April 6, 1999, Stoyky tilted to the port side at pier No. 1 due to the plundering of outboard fittings. Later the ship was raised.

She was sold to China for scrap in 2001.

References 

1985 ships
Ships built at Severnaya Verf
Cold War destroyers of the Soviet Union
Sovremenny-class destroyers